Barbara Bailey may refer to:

Barbara Bailey (artist) (1910–2003), English nun and original illustrator of the "Bunnykins" tableware
Barbara Evelyn Bailey (born 1942), Jamaican educator and gender studies advocate
Barbara Bailey (politician), American politician
Barbara Bailey (Connecticut Four), American librarian